ADbc is an Australian television comedy history quiz show hosted by Sam Pang. It was first broadcast on SBS One in 2009.

Summary
There are two teams of two contestants, the AD team and the bc team. Each team consists of an academic and a celebrity working together in an attempt to win the game. ADbc is full of facts and games that inspire some intelligent discussion and some blatantly silly behaviour.

Cast
Sam Pang is a presenter, writer, broadcaster and producer.

Regular panellists include: 
 Meshel Laurie
 Tony Martin
 Dr Andrea Rizzi of Melbourne University
 Professor Graeme Davison from Monash University
 Writer Alice Pung.

Other guests include Matt Preston, Kate Langbroek, Judith Lucy, Graeme Blundell, Celia Pacquola, Andrew Rule, Angus Sampson, George McEncroe, Santo Cilauro and Merrick Watts.

References

Special Broadcasting Service original programming
2009 Australian television series debuts